Dance Mixes: Afiste Tin & Tora Arhizoun Ta Dyskola (Greek: Dance Mixes: Αφήστε Την & Τώρα Αρχίζουν Τα Δύσκολα; English: Dance Mixes: Leave Her Alone & Now The Difficult Times Begin) is the second EP album by popular Greek pop rock singer Sakis Rouvas, released on May 24, 2007 by his former label Universal Music, along with the imprint of Mercury Records. It features a compilation of previously released remixes of songs recorded from 1994 to 1996 and produced by Nikos Karvelas. The EP was also used as promotion for the box set compilation album Ap'Tin Arhi: I Megaliteres Epitihies released the same year.

Track listing

External links
 Official site

2007 EPs
Albums produced by Nikos Karvelas
Greek-language albums
Sakis Rouvas EPs
2007 remix albums
Remix EPs
Universal Music Greece EPs
Universal Music Greece remix albums
Mercury Records remix albums
Mercury Records EPs